Metaphatus ichnius is a moth of the  family Palaephatidae. It was described by Donald R. Davis in 1986. It is found in the temperate Andean forests of southern Chile, from Malleco Province south to Chiloe Island.

The length of the forewings is 8.5–9 mm for males and 9–9.6 mm for females. Adults have dark brown forewings, irregularly streaked with heavy, sinuate, white to pale buff lines. They are on wing from December to February in one generation per year.

Etymology
The specific name is derived from Greek ichnion (meaning a small track or trail) and refers to the pale, sinuate streak on the forewing.

References

Moths described in 1986
Palaephatidae
Taxa named by Donald R. Davis (entomologist)
Endemic fauna of Chile